David Weinberger (born 1950) is an American author, technologist, and speaker. Trained as a philosopher, Weinberger's work focuses on how technology — particularly the internet and machine learning — is changing our ideas, with books about the effect of machine learning’s complex models on business strategy and sense of meaning; order and organization in the digital age; the networking of knowledge; the Net's effect on core concepts of self and place; and the shifts in relationships between businesses and their markets.

Career 
Weinberger holds a Ph.D. from the University of Toronto and taught college from 1980-1986 primarily at Stockton University (then known as Stockton State College). From 1986 until the early 2000s he wrote about technology, and became a marketing consultant and executive at several high-tech companies, including Interleaf and Open Text. His best-known book is 2000’s Cluetrain Manifesto (co-authored), a work noted for its early awareness of the Net as social medium. From 1997 through 2003 he was a frequent commentator on National Public Radio's All Things Considered, with about three dozen contributions. In addition, he was a gag writer for the comic strip "Inside Woody Allen" from 1976 to 1983.

In 2004 he became a Fellow at Harvard’s Berkman Klein Center for Internet & Society and as of 2023 serves as an affiliation of the center. In 2008 he served as a visiting lecturer at Harvard Law School and co-taught a course on "The Web Difference" with John Palfrey. From 2010 to 2014 he was Co-Director of the Harvard Library Innovation Lab. In 2015, he was a fellow at the Shorenstein Center on Media, Politics and Public Policy at Harvard’s Kennedy School of Government. He is an advisor to Harvard’s MetaLAB metaLAB, and the Harvard Business School Digital Initiative, and other non-commercial and commercial organizations. He continues to teach courses at Harvard Extension School on the effect of technology on ideas.

Beginning in 2015, Weinberger turned much of his attention to the philosophical and ethical implications of machine learning, resulting in a series of articles, talks and workshops, and his 2019 book Everyday Chaos. From June 2018  to June 2020, he was embedded in  Google’s People + AI Research (PAIR), a machine learning research group located in Cambridge, Massachusetts, as a part-time writer-in-residence.

Weinberger has been involved in Internet policy and advocacy. He had the title Senior Internet Advisor to Howard Dean's 2004 presidential campaign, and was on technology policy advisory councils for both of Barack Obama’s presidential campaigns and Hillary Clinton’s 2016 campaign. From 2010-12 he was a Franklin Fellow at the U.S. Department of State, working with the e-Diplomacy Group. He has written and spoken frequently in favor of policies that favor a more open Internet, including in Salon, NPR,  We Are the Internet and in a series of video interviews with the Federal Communications Commission.

Honors
In 2007, The Massachusetts Technology Leadership Council named him Mover & Shaker of the Year 
2012, Too Big to Know won both the World Technology Award as best technology book of the year and the GetAbstract International Book Award
In 2014, Simmons College made him an honorary Doctor of Letters.
Axiom named  ``Everyday Chaos`` the "Best Business Commentary of 2019", and Inc. magazine listed it as one of 2019's "11 Must-Read Books for Entrepreneurs"

Books

The Cluetrain Manifesto, 2000
Small Pieces Loosely Joined: A Unified Theory of the Web, 2002 
Everything is Miscellaneous: The Power of the New Digital Disorder, 2007 
Too Big to Know: Rethinking Knowledge Now That the Facts Aren't the Facts, Experts Are Everywhere, and the Smartest Person in the Room Is the Room, 2012
Everyday Chaos: Technology, Complexity, and How We’re Thriving in a New World of Possibility', 2019

Other works

How Machine Learning Pushes Us to Define Fairness: Harvard Business Review, Nov. 2019.
Our Machines Now Have Knowledge We’ll Never Understand Wired, Apr. 18, 2017.
Optimization over Explanation Berkman Klein, Jan. 28, 2018
New Clues (with Doc Searls)
Library as Platform, Library Journal, Sept. 4,2012
Shift Happens, "The Chronicle of Higher Education," April 22, 2012
"The Machine That Would Predict the Future", Scientific American, Dec. 2011 
 World of Ends, What the Internet Is and How to Stop Mistaking It for Something Else (with Doc Searls)
Transparency is the New Objectivity, Joho the Blog, July 19, 2009
“To Know but Not Understand,” The Atlantic, Jan. 3, 2012
 "The Internet that was (and still could be)", The Atlantic, June 22, 2015.

References

External links

 Home page
 Personal blog
 Everyday Chaos talks and podcasts
 Harvard/Berkman Center page
 What Fairness Can Learn from AI: Harvard Business School’s Digital Initiative, lightning talk, Oct. 2019
 Chaos Journalism: AI, Our Democracy, and the Future - Invited lecture, Arizona State University Chaos Journalism: AI, Our Democracy, and the Future, Sept. 26, 2019
 Pointing at the Wrong Villain: Cass Sunstein and Echo Chambers ‘‘Los Angeles Review of Books’’, July 20, 2017
 Podcast Interview at MFG Innovationcast (starting minute 11:10)
 Podcast Interview at CBC's Spark.
 Interview on 99FACES.tv about The Cluetrain Manifesto and Too Big To Know''
 

1950 births
People from New York (state)
Living people
20th-century American Jews
American bloggers
American technology writers
American philosophers
Jewish philosophers
Berkman Fellows
Bucknell University alumni
University of Toronto alumni
21st-century American Jews